Sparagmia is a monotypic moth genus of the family Crambidae described by Achille Guenée in 1854. Its only species, Sparagmia gonoptera, described by Pierre André Latreille in 1828, is found in Central and South America and in the Antilles. Records include Argentina, Brazil, Panama, Costa Rica, Puerto Rico, Cuba and Jamaica.

Subspecies
Sparagmia gonoptera gonoptera
Sparagmia gonoptera shoumatoffi Munroe, 1958 (Jamaica)

References

Spilomelinae
Crambidae genera
Taxa named by Achille Guenée
Monotypic moth genera